Tayto may refer to:
Tayto (Northern Ireland), a Northern Irish manufacturer of crisps and corn snacks (also known as "Northern Tayto")
Tayto (Republic of Ireland), a major Irish crisps and popcorn manufacturer
 An Irish synonym for crisps (potato chips).

See also
 Taito (disambiguation)